Stenocaecilius is a genus of lizard barklice in the family Caeciliusidae. There are more than 40 described species in Stenocaecilius.

Species
These 45 species belong to the genus Stenocaecilius:

 Stenocaecilius analis (Banks, 1931)
 Stenocaecilius andromimus (Badonnel, 1955)
 Stenocaecilius angustipennis (Badonnel, 1949)
 Stenocaecilius antennalis (Badonnel, 1948)
 Stenocaecilius antillanus (Banks, 1938)
 Stenocaecilius arotellus (Banks, 1942)
 Stenocaecilius australis (Enderlein, 1903)
 Stenocaecilius bamboutensis (Badonnel, 1943)
 Stenocaecilius benoiti (Badonnel, 1976)
 Stenocaecilius caboverdensis (Meinander, 1966)
 Stenocaecilius casarum (Badonnel, 1931)
 Stenocaecilius congolensis (Badonnel, 1946)
 Stenocaecilius crassicornis (Enderlein, 1931)
 Stenocaecilius decolor (Badonnel, 1967)
 Stenocaecilius dundoensis (Badonnel, 1955)
 Stenocaecilius elongatus (Smithers, 1964)
 Stenocaecilius fallax (Badonnel, 1948)
 Stenocaecilius fuscicornis (Badonnel, 1977)
 Stenocaecilius gilvus (Pearman, 1932)
 Stenocaecilius glossopterus (Badonnel, 1931)
 Stenocaecilius griveaudi (Badonnel, 1976)
 Stenocaecilius guineensis (Baz, 1990)
 Stenocaecilius insularum (Mockford, 1966)
 Stenocaecilius insulatus (Smithers & Thornton, 1974)
 Stenocaecilius kivuensis (Badonnel, 1959)
 Stenocaecilius lineatus (Smithers, 1977)
 Stenocaecilius linguipennis (Badonnel, 1943)
 Stenocaecilius lucidus (Pearman, 1932)
 Stenocaecilius lundensis (Badonnel, 1955)
 Stenocaecilius machadoi (Badonnel, 1955)
 Stenocaecilius marianus (Thornton, Lee & Chui, 1972)
 Stenocaecilius moffiensis (Badonnel, 1977)
 Stenocaecilius oxycopeus (Ribaga, 1911)
 Stenocaecilius pacificus (Smithers & Thornton, 1974)
 Stenocaecilius petchkovskya (Badonnel, 1955)
 Stenocaecilius photophilus (Badonnel, 1977)
 Stenocaecilius pictifrons (Thornton & Wong, 1966)
 Stenocaecilius propinquifallax (Turner & Cheke, 1983)
 Stenocaecilius quercus (Edwards, 1950)
 Stenocaecilius rutshuruanus (Badonnel, 1948)
 Stenocaecilius suturalis (Badonnel, 1955)
 Stenocaecilius transversalis (Badonnel, 1948)
 Stenocaecilius turneri (New, 1977)
 Stenocaecilius vilhenai (Badonnel, 1955)
 Stenocaecilius voov (Enderlein, 1931)

References

Caeciliusidae
Articles created by Qbugbot